Guntram Wolff is a political economist and the Director and CEO of the German Council on Foreign Relations DGAP. From 2013-22, he was the Director of Bruegel. He is also a (part-time) Professor at the Solvay school of Université libre de Bruxelles. Under his leadership, Bruegel became a leading institute for European economic policy and has been ranked the top international think tank outside of the US by the University of Pennsylvania Think tank ranking (UPenn ranking). His research is focused on European political economy, climate change, geoeconomics and macroeconomics and has been published in academic journals such as Nature, Science, Nature Communications, Energy Policy, Research Policy, Journal of European Public Policy, European Journal of Political Economy, Public Choice and Journal of Banking and Finance. He regularly testifies to the European Union Finance Ministers’ ECOFIN meeting, the European Parliament, the German Parliament (Bundestag) and the French Parliament (Assemblée Nationale). From 2012 until 2016, he was a member of the Conseil d’Analyse Economique (CAE) under successive Prime Ministers Jean-Marc Ayrault and Manuel Valls.

Education
Wolff holds a PhD from the University of Bonn, studied economics in Bonn, Toulouse, Pittsburgh and Passau. He is fluent in German, English, French and has some knowledge of Bulgarian and Spanish.

Career
Wolff joined Bruegel from the European Commission, where he worked on the macroeconomics of the euro area and the reform of euro area governance. Prior to joining the Commission, he was coordinating the research team on fiscal policy at Deutsche Bundesbank. He also worked as an adviser to the International Monetary Fund (IMF).

In 2013, Wolff joined the Glienicker Gruppe, a group of pro-European lawyers, economists and political scientists founded by Jakob von Weizsäcker and Maximilian Steinbeis.

In 2018, IMF Managing Director Christine Lagarde appointed Wolff to the External Advisory Group on Surveillance, a group mandated to review the Fund's operational priorities through 2025. In early 2021, he was appointed by the G20 as project director in charge of the High Level Independent Panel (HLIP) on financing the global commons for pandemic preparedness and response, co-chaired by Ngozi Okonjo-Iweala, Tharman Shanmugaratnam and Lawrence Summers.

In 2020, Business Insider ranked him one of the 28 most influential power players in Europe “hashing out the rules of everything”. he is also ranked one of the top 100 German speaking economists by FAZ and top 5% of the more than 60000 registered economists on Repec.

Wolff has taught economics at the University of Pittsburgh and at Université libre de Bruxelles. His columns and policy work are published and cited in leading international media such as the Financial Times, the New York Times, Wall Street Journal, Caixin, Nikkei, El País, La Stampa, FAZ, Handelsblatt, Les Echos, BBC, ZDF, among others.

Other activities
 Círculo de Empresarios, Member of the Advisory Board
 Mastercard Center for Inclusive Growth, Fellow and Member of the Academic Advisory Council
 Solvay Brussels School of Economics and Management, Member of the International Advisory Board

Publications
Wolff's publications are available on www.guntramwolff.net. Recent Bruegel publications can be found here: http://bruegel.org/author/guntram-b-wolff/

Selected academic journal publications include
 The effect of Covid certificates on vaccine uptake, public health and the economy, Nature communications, 13, 3942 (2022), (with Miquel Oliu-Barton, Bary Pradelski, Nicolas Woloszco, Lionel Guetta-Jeanrenaud, Philippe Aghion, Patrick Artus, Arnaud Fontanet, Philippe Martin), DOI.
 How to weaken Russian oil and gas strength, Science, (letter), Vol 376 (6592), p. 469, 2022, (with Ricardo Hausmann, Agata Łoskot-Strachota, Axel Ockenfels, Ulrich Schetter, Simone Tagliapietra, Guntram Wolff, Georg Zachmann),DOI
 The global quest for green growth: an economic policy perspective, Sustainability, 14(9), 5555, 2022, (with Klaas Lenaerts and Simone Tagliapietra), DOI
 Three ways Europe could limit Russian oil and gas revenues, Nature, (correspondence) Vol 604, 246, 2022, (with Axel Ockenfels and Simone Tagliapietra), DOI
 What drives implementation of the European Union's policy recommendations to its member countries?, Journal of Economic Policy Reform, 2022, (with Konstantinos Efstathiou), DOI
 The Kremlin's gas wars: How Europe can protect itself from Russian blackmail, Foreign Affairs, 27 February 2022 (with Niclas Poitiers, Simone Tagliapietra and Georg Zachmann) (link).
 Elimination versus mitigation of SARS-CoV-2 in the presence of effective vaccines, Lancet Global Health, DOI, with M. Oliu-Barton, B. Pradelski, Y. Algan, M. Baker, A. Binagwaho, G. Dore, A. El-Mohandes, A. Fontanet, A. Peichl, V Priesemann, G. Yamey, J. Lazarus.
 Conditions are ideal for a new climate club, with Simone Tagliapietra, Energy Policy, DOI
 Form a climate club: United States, European Union and China, with Simone Tagliapietra, Nature, 591, pp 526–528, DOI.
 The EU can't separate climate policy from foreign policy, with Mark Leonard, Jean Pisani-Ferry, Jeremy Shapiro, Simone Tagliapietry, Foreign Affairs, Feb 9, 2021 (link).
 Hybrid and cybersecurity threats and the European Union's financial system, with Maria Demertzis, Journal of Financial Regulation, Oxford University Press, Vol 6(2), pp. 306–16, 2020, DOI.
 What are the prerequisites for a euro area fiscal capacity?, with Maria Demertzis, Journal of Economic Policy Reform, Vol 23(3), 2019, DOI. 
 Securing Europe's economic sovereignty, with Mark Leonard, Jean Pisani-Ferry, Elina Ribakova, Jeremy Shapiro, Survival, Vol 61(5), pp. 75–98, 2019, DOI.
 Capital markets union and the fintech opportunity, with Maria Demertzis and Silvia Merler, Journal of Financial Regulation, Oxford University Press, Vol 4(1), 2018, DOI
 Explaining the Evolving Role of National Parliaments Under the European Semester, with Mark Hallerberg and Benedicta Marzinotto, Journal of European Public Policy, 25(2), pp 250–267, 2017, (DOI)
 Capital markets union: a vision for the long term, with Nicolas Veron, Journal of Financial Regulation, Oxford University Press, Vol 2(1), 2016 DOI.
 Rules and risk in the euro area, with Anna Iara, European Journal of Political Economy, 34, pp 222–236, 2014, (doi)
 Identifying discretionary fiscal policy reactions with real time data, with Ulf von Kalckreuth, Journal of Money, Credit and Banking 2011, DOI .
 Heterogeneity in money holdings across euro area countries: the role of housing, with Ralph Setzer and Paul van den Noord, European Journal of Political Economy, DOI
 The macroeconomic effects of exogenous fiscal policy shocks in Germany: a disaggregated SVAR analysis with Kirsten H. Heppke-Falk and Jörn Tenhofen, Journal of Economics and Statistics – Jahrbücher für Nationalökonomie und Statistik, 230 (3), 2010. 
 The German sub-national government bond market: structure, determinants of yield spreads and Berlin's foregone bail-out with Alexander Schulz, Journal of Economics and Statistics – Jahrbücher für Nationalökonomie und Statistik, 229(1), 61-83, 2009. 
 Fiscal institutions, fiscal policy and sovereign risk premia in EMU with Mark Hallerberg, Public Choice, 136(3-4), 379-396, 2008. (Springer online ) 
 The effectiveness of subsidies revisited: accounting for wage and employment effects in business R&D with Volker Reinthaler, Research Policy, 37, 1403–1412, 2008.
 Moral hazard and bail-out in fiscal federations: Evidence for the German Länder with Kirsten Heppke-Falk, Kyklos – International Review for Social Sciences, 61(3), 425-46, 2008 
 Fool the markets? Creative accounting, fiscal transparency and sovereign risk premia with Kerstin Bernoth, Scottish Journal of Political Economy, 55(4), 465-87, 2008 
 Foreign direct investment in the enlarged EU: do taxes matter and to what extent?, Open Economies Review 18(3), 327-46, 2007 DOI .
 What do deficits tell us about debt? Empirical evidence on creative accounting with fiscal rules in the EU with Jürgen von Hagen, Journal of Banking and Finance, volume 30 (12), 3259-3279, 2006.
 A Compromise Estimate of German Net National Product 1851-1913 and its Implications for Growth and Business Cycles with Carsten Burhop, Journal of Economic History, volume 65 (3), p. 613-657, 2005.

References

External links
 http://www.guntramwolff.net

German economists
Living people
Year of birth missing (living people)
University of Bonn alumni
Bruegel (think tank) people
University of Pittsburgh faculty